The GSI Helmholtz Centre for Heavy Ion Research is a federally and state co-funded heavy ion research center in the Wixhausen suburb of Darmstadt, Germany. It was founded in 1969 as the Society for Heavy Ion Research, abbreviated GSI, to conduct research on and with heavy-ion accelerators. It is the only major user research center in the State of Hesse.

The laboratory performs basic and applied research in physics and related natural science disciplines. Main fields of study include plasma physics, atomic physics, nuclear structure and reactions research, biophysics and medical research.  The lab is a member of the Helmholtz Association of German Research Centres.

Shareholders are the German Federal Government (90%) and the State of Hesse, Thuringia and Rhineland-Palatinate. As a member of the Helmholtz Association, the current name was given to the facility on 7 October 2008 in order to bring it sharper national and international awareness.

The GSI Helmholtz Centre for Heavy Ion Research has strategic partnerships with the Technische Universität Darmstadt, Goethe University Frankfurt, Johannes Gutenberg University Mainz and the Frankfurt Institute for Advanced Studies.

Primary research
The chief tool is the heavy ion accelerator facility consisting of:

UNILAC, the Universal Linear Accelerator (energy of 2 – 11.4 MeV per nucleon)
 SIS 18 (Schwer-Ionen-Synchrotron), the heavy-ion synchrotron (0.010 – 2 GeV/u) 
 ESR, the experimental storage ring (0.005 – 0.5 GeV/u) 
 FRS Fragment Separator.

The UNILAC was commissioned in 1975; the SIS 18 and the ESR were added in 1990 boosting the ion acceleration from 10% of light speed to 90%.

Elements discovered at GSI: bohrium (1981), meitnerium (1982), hassium (1984), darmstadtium (1994), roentgenium (1994), and copernicium (1996).

Elements confirmed at GSI: nihonium (2012), flerovium (2009), moscovium (2012), livermorium (2010), and tennessine (2012).

Technological developments
Another important technology developed at the GSI is the use of heavy ion beams for cancer treatment (from 1997). Instead of using X-ray radiation, carbon ions are used to irradiate the patient. The technique allows tumors which are close to vital organs to be treated, which is not possible with X-rays. This is due to the fact that the Bragg peak of carbon ions is much sharper than the peak of X-ray photons. A facility based on this technology, called Heidelberger Ionenstrahl-Therapiezentrum (HIT), built at the University of Heidelberg Medical Center began treating patients in November 2009.

Facilities other than UNILAC and SIS-18

 Two high-energy lasers, the nhelix (Nanosecond High Energy Laser for heavy Ion eXperiments) and the Phelix (Petawatt High Energy Laser for heavy Ion eXperiments).
 A Large Area Neutron Detector (LAND).
 A FRagment Separator (FRS) – The GSI Fragment Separator or FRS is a facility built in 1990. It produces and separates different beams of (usually) radioactive ions. The process is made from a stable beam accelerated by UNILAC and then SIS impinging on a production target. From this, many fragments are produced. The secondary beam is produced by magnetic selection of the ions.
 An Experimental Storage Ring (ESR) in which large numbers of highly charged radioactive ions can be stored for extended periods of time with energies of 0.005 – 0.5 GeV/u. This facility provides the means to make precise measurements of their decay modes. The discovery of a mysterious new phenomenon is known as the GSI anomaly.

Future evolution
In the years to come, GSI will evolve to an international structure named FAIR for Facility for Antiproton and Ion Research: one new synchrotron (with respective magnetic rigidity 100 T⋅m), a Super-FRS and several new rings among which one that can be used for antimatter research. The major part of the facility will be commissioned in 2022; full operation is planned for 2025.

The creation of FAIR was co-signed on 7 November 2007 by 10 countries: Finland, France, Germany, India, Romania, Russia, Slovenia, Sweden, United Kingdom, and Poland. Representatives included Annette Schavan, the German federal minister of science and Roland Koch, the prime minister of the state of Hesse.

See also
 GANIL
 Riken
 JINR
 CERN
 NSCL
 ISIS neutron source
 RAON

References

External links

 HGF
 GSI
 FAIR

Darmstadt
Nuclear research institutes
Research institutes in Germany